XHUVA-FM is a radio station in Aguascalientes City, Aguascalientes, Mexico. Broadcasting on 90.5 FM, XHUVA-FM is owned by Radiogrupo and carries an adult hits format known as Uva.

History
XEUVA-AM 1170 received its concession on September 20, 1974. It migrated to FM after receiving its authorization in 2010.

Previous formats have included La Rancherita and Radio Recuerdo.

References

Adult hits radio stations
Mass media in Aguascalientes City
Radio stations in Aguascalientes
Radio stations established in 1974
Spanish-language radio stations